Black needlerush is a common name for several rushes in the genus Juncus and may refer to:

Juncus gerardii, native to northern North America and Europe
Juncus roemerianus, native to the southeastern United States and the Caribbean